Truck Stop is a Lasse Stefanz studio album released on 3 June 2009. It was certified platinum in Sweden.

Track listing 
Ge mig mera
En sång till en vän                                        
Clap Your Hands and Stamp Your Feet
Till en hjälte
Green Green Grass of Home
Hon tog mitt hjärta
Fjärlilslätta steg
Här hör jag hemma
Mary Ann
I natt är hon fri
Jag är så ensam nu i kväll
Jambalaya (On the Bayou)
Med vinden i ryggen
Jag bär på en gåva

Charts

Certifications

References 

2009 albums
Lasse Stefanz albums